Metamora is a village in Metamora Township, Woodford County, Illinois, United States. The population was 3,636 at the 2010 census. Metamora is a growing suburb of Peoria and is part of the Peoria, Illinois Metropolitan Statistical Area.

Geography
Metamora is located at  (40.7911, -89.3624).

Name
Metamora was founded as Hanover in 1836. It was named for Hanover, New Hampshire by a consortium of land speculators called the Hanover Company. New post office conventions required towns to have unique names, forcing the town to differentiate itself from others in Illinois named Hanover. Early post office names included Black Partridge (1836) and Partridge Point (1837). The name of the village was finally changed to Metamora in 1845 based on the character in the popular play Metamora; or, The Last of the Wampanoags. The village still has a Hanover Street and Partridge Street, reflecting these earlier names.  Also, a popular location Black Partridge Park.

History
Metamora was settled by Yankee settlers.  These were people from New England who were descended from the English Puritans who settled that region in the 1600s.  The first group were settlers from Hanover, New Hampshire, organized by a company from Gilmanton, New Hampshire who named the town Hanover.  A New England man named John Page scouted the area for the company and decided that this particular tract of land would be a good place for farms.  When they arrived the area was a forest, with no roads and no structures.  The New Hampshire settlers cleared the forest, constructed roads and built farms as well as a small town to support the farms.  Other New England settlers arrived shortly thereafter from the states of Rhode Island, Vermont and Massachusetts.  Metamora was the county seat of Woodford County from 1843 until 1896.  The Metamora Courthouse State Historic Site, a courthouse from this period, is preserved as an Illinois state historic site.  Future President Abraham Lincoln and future Vice President Adlai E. Stevenson I practiced law there.

Demographics

As of the census of 2000, there were 2,700 people, 1,050 households, and 743 families residing in the village. The racial makeup of the village was 99.07% White, 0.26% African American, 0.19% Native American, 0.00% Asian, 0.07% from other races, and 0.33% from two or more races. Hispanic or Latino of any race were 0.63% of the population.

There were 1,050 households, out of which 30.4% had children under the age of 18 living with them, 61.3% were married couples living together, 8.0% had a female householder with no husband present, and 29.2% were non-families. 27.4% of all households were made up of individuals, and 17.6% had someone living alone who was 65 years of age or older. The average household size was 2.44 and the average family size was 2.97.

In the village, the population was spread out, with 23.8% under the age of 18, 5.6% from 18 to 24, 23.4% from 25 to 44, 22.2% from 45 to 64, and 25.0% who were 65 years of age or older. The median age was 43 years. For every 100 females, there were 87.5 males. For every 100 females age 18 and over, there were 81.7 males.

The median income for a household in the village was $46,691, and the median income for a family was $56,384. Males had a median income of $40,745 versus $26,505 for females. The per capita income for the village was $20,200. About 1.8% of families and 2.9% of the population were below the poverty line, including 3.8% of those under age 18 and 2.0% of those age 65 or over.

Education
Metamora has a grade school district, a high school district, and a Catholic grade school.

The village is served by Metamora Community Consolidated School District 1 for Kindergarten through 8th grade and by Metamora Township High School for 9th through 12th.
Metamora Grade School District 1 serves Kindergarten through Grade 8 in Metamora Township and parts of nearby Worth Township.
Metamora Township High School District 122 operates one four-year high school serving the village, along with nearby Germantown Hills, and Spring Bay.
St. Mary's Grade School Grades Kindergarten-8th

Events
At the beginning of August, Metamora hosts the annual "Metamora 4x50" race, an ultracycling event in which participants compete by riding a 50-mile loop four times.

The Redbirds are the local high school team mascot, and students participate in a range of regional sports meets including golf, volleyball, and soccer.

The Village of Metamora puts on Old Settler’s Days each year around the third week of June.  It’s a century-old tradition involving carnival rides, live local music, and plenty of food.  The Lincoln-Douglas 5K and 8 Mile Runs are also conducted during the weekend of Old Settler’s Days.

Government

Popular culture
Metamora, Illinois served as the location for the fictional Edgecreek, Illinois in several independent films from Ten Thirty-One Pictures Entertainment, including The Only Way in 2004.

Metamora was cited in the 2012 film Lincoln.  The President tells his Cabinet a story about the Melissa Goings murder case, which took place there in 1857.

References

External links
Village of Metamora - official website
Historic Illinois (Bradley University)
Metamora Township High School

Villages in Illinois
Villages in Woodford County, Illinois
Peoria metropolitan area, Illinois
Populated places established in 1836
1836 establishments in Illinois
Former county seats in Illinois